Royal Randwick Racecourse is a racecourse for horse racing located in the Eastern Suburbs of Sydney, New South Wales. Randwick Racecourse is Crown Land leased to the Australian Turf Club and known to many Sydney racegoers as headquarters. The racecourse is located about six kilometres from the Sydney Central Business District in the suburb of Randwick. The course proper has a circumference of 2224m with a home straight of 410m.

On 14 October 2017, the inaugural running of The Everest was held at Royal Randwick. The Everest is the richest race in Australia and the richest turf race in the world with $15 million in prize money.

Since 2014, Randwick hosts The Championships, a two-day season-ending meeting in April that offers over AUD$20 million in prize money. It features several Group 1 races such as the Australian Derby, Doncaster Handicap and Queen Elizabeth Stakes.

Other annual events include the Sydney Carnival, Spring Carnival and the Chinese Festival of Racing.

History 
In January 1833, NSW Governor Richard Bourke designated the land for use as a racecourse. Up until then, Hyde Park in the Sydney CBD had been the main venue for racing within the city. The first race held at Randwick was a private event held in June 1833. The course was originally known as the 'Sandy Course' due to the condition of the ground. In 1840 racing ceased at the venue and was only used for training.

In the early 1840s, the Australian Jockey Club (AJC) was formed and in 1860 moved its headquarters to Randwick. In May of that year, racing resumed at the venue with a crowd of 6,000 people attending.

In 1863 the land was officially granted to the AJC and was held until 2011 when the AJC and the Sydney Turf Club (STC) merged to become the Australian Turf Club (ATC). The ATC are the current operators of Royal Randwick Racecourse.

'Royal' Randwick
On 22 February 1992, Queen Elizabeth II visited Randwick Racecourse and opened the Paddock Stand. On this date, upon request, the Queen granted permission for the venue to be known as Royal Randwick. From this date the venue was officially able to be referred to as 'Royal Randwick'. An extract from a letter from Kenneth Scott, Deputy Private Secretary to Queen Elizabeth II, to the club reads: "You do not need me to tell you how much The Queen and The Duke of Edinburgh enjoyed their visit to the Royal Randwick Racecourse today. Her Majesty was particularly glad that she was able, on this occasion, to legitimise your traditional title of "Royal" and to open a very handsome new Grandstand."

Races 
The following is a list of Group races which are contested at Randwick Racecourse.

Venue 
Besides horseracing, Randwick Racecourse has been used as a venue for many other events including concerts and religious masses.

In 1970, Pope Paul VI celebrated mass at Randwick as part of his pastoral visit to Australia. The Racecourse was also the site of a mass held by Pope John Paul II in 1995 for the Beatification ceremony of Australia's first potential saint Mary MacKillop. It was also the site of the vigil and final mass of World Youth Day 2008 in July 2008.  Racing was stopped for several weeks, due to the alterations needed to hold over 400,000 people. This move had been opposed by the Randwick Trainers Association, which holds lease interests over some areas intended to be used for the event. The dispute was resolved, by the federal government and the state government jointly pledging $40 million as reimbursement to the racing industry. The famous racecourse has also appeared in several films, including Mission: Impossible 2.

Randwick Racecourse is also used as an exam venue by the University of New South Wales.

In addition, the annual Future Music Festival was held at the racecourse from 2006 until it was cancelled in 2015.

Buildings & Spaces

Queen Elizabeth II Grandstand: 2013 – Present
The Queen Elizabeth II (QEII) Grandstand is the main grandstand building. Originally constructed in 1969, it was torn down to its bare structure and rebuilt into the current state in 2012 and reopened to the public in 2013. It is 110m in length and 6 storeys high.

Official / Members Stand: 1886 – Present
The Official / Members Stand was constructed in 1886 and still remains today although it has been extended and modified multiple times, in 1907, 1914 and 1920.

Theatre of the Horse (ToTH): 2013 – Present
The Theatre of the Horse, also known as the "ToTH", is an outdoor auditorium for the presentation of thoroughbred racehorses both before and after a race. The ToTH is linked to the track-front via a tunnel in which the horses access the track. The ToTH has a capacity of 4,500 and is also used for live music events and functions. The construction of the ToTH was not without controversy, many racegoers have criticised the space for not being located trackside.

Saddling Paddock Tote Building: 1917 – Present
The Saddling Paddock Tote Building, known as the Octagonal bar, is located behind the main grandstand. It was initially constructed in 1917 to house a Totalisator, the fourth in the world to be installed. The building is now used as an event space and a bar on race days.

Owners Pavilion: 2013 – Present
The Owners Pavilion is located directly adjacent to the Theatre of the Horse and is a private space for racehorse owners. The pavilion was constructed at the same time as the new QEII Grandstand and ToTH.

Paddock Stand: 1992–2012
The Paddock Stand replaced the St Leger Stand and Grandstand and was a two-storey, long, horizontal structure. The stand was formally opened by Queen Elizabeth II in February 1992, it was also on this occasion that the Queen certified Randwick as "Royal". The Paddock Stand was demolished in 2012 to make way for the new QEII Grandstand.

Tea House: 1914–2012
The Tea House was a large structure at 50m long, 27m wide and two storeys high and could accommodate 1,000 racegoers. The original Tea house burnt down in 1917 and was immediately reconstructed to the same specifications. The Tea House was demolished in 2012 as part of the upgrades to the current layout.

Ladies Stand: 1910–1998
The Ladies Stand, also known as the Queens or Royal Stand was constructed in 1910 and remained until 1998.

First Grandstand: 1860–1875
The First Grandstand was constructed for the first race meeting at Randwick and was made of American timber. Designed by John Hilly, it was intended to be temporary but stood for 15 years.

Second Grandstand: 1876–1988
The Second Grandstand, also known as the Paddock Stand, was constructed to replace the initial grandstand constructed on site. It was extended in 1907 and 1914 and remained for more than 100 years to 1988 when it was demolished to make way for the new Paddock Stand.

See also 

 List of Australian organisations with royal patronage
 Big Stable Newmarket

References

External links 
 Randwick Racecourse, Australian Town and Country Journal, (Saturday, 25 September 1886), p.661; Australian Town and Country Journal, (Saturday, 25 September 1886), p.654.
  [CC-By-SA]

External links

Australian Turf Club

 
Horse racing venues in Australia
Sports venues in Sydney
1833 establishments in Australia
Sports venues completed in 1833